Sofie Borchgrevink (26 September 1846 – 5 December 1911) was a Norwegian educator. 
She was born in Christiania, a daughter of Major General Fredrik Laurentius Klouman and Wilhelmine Kristine Juell. She was mother-in-law of museologist Stian Herlofsen Finne-Grønn.

She served as principal at Kristiania kvinnelige industriskole from 1888 to 1911.

References

1846 births
1911 deaths
Schoolteachers from Oslo
Heads of schools in Norway